Zdeněk Remsa (29 December 1928 – 22 June 2019) was a Czech ski jumper. He competed at the 1948 Winter Olympics.

References

External links
 

1928 births
2019 deaths
Czech male ski jumpers
Olympic ski jumpers of Czechoslovakia
Ski jumpers at the 1948 Winter Olympics
People from Semily District
Sportspeople from the Liberec Region